231 athletes (153 men and 78 women) from Germany competed at the 1996 Summer Paralympics in Atlanta, United States.

Medallists

See also
Germany at the Paralympics
Germany at the 1996 Summer Olympics

References 

Nations at the 1996 Summer Paralympics
1996
Summer Paralympics